Savonlinna Airport  in Finland is about  north of Savonlinna town centre along the Enonkoskentie road. It has a single asphalt runway, two gates, one with a waiting area fitted with seats, and a small cafeteria. Its busiest times are during the Savonlinna Opera Festival when there are more scheduled and charter flights to the airport.

Airlines and destinations

Statistics

See also
 List of the busiest airports in the Nordic countries

References

External links
 Finavia – Savonlinna Airport
 AIP Finland – Savonlinna Airport
 
 
 

Airports in Finland
Airport
Buildings and structures in South Savo